Reid Philip Simpson (born May 21, 1969) is a Canadian former professional ice hockey left winger who played twelve seasons in the National Hockey League (NHL) for the Philadelphia Flyers, Minnesota North Stars, New Jersey Devils, Chicago Blackhawks, Tampa Bay Lightning, St. Louis Blues, Montreal Canadiens, Nashville Predators and Pittsburgh Penguins. Simpson was recently featured in the book "Warriors on the Ice: Hockey's Toughest Talk." In it, Simpson spoke about his epic fights with Joey Kocur, Bob Probert, and Stu Grimson. He is currently a professional scout with the Montreal Canadiens.

Playing career
Simpson was drafted 72nd overall by the Flyers in the 1989 NHL Entry Draft and went on to play in 301 regular season games, notching up 18 goals and 18 assists for 36 points, racking up 838 penalty minutes in the process. He won a Calder Cup with the Albany River Rats in 1995. The veteran attempted a comeback during the 2009–10 season in the American Hockey League for the Chicago Wolves. Simpson played 14 games for the Wolves. Before his return he had spent from 2005 until 2007 playing in the Russian Super League.

Career statistics

Regular season and playoffs

References

External links
 

1969 births
Living people
Albany River Rats players
Canadian ice hockey left wingers
Chicago Blackhawks players
Chicago Wolves players
Cleveland Lumberjacks players
HC Vityaz players
Hershey Bears players
Ice hockey people from Manitoba
Kalamazoo Wings (1974–2000) players
Flin Flon Bombers players
Milwaukee Admirals players
Minnesota North Stars players
Montreal Canadiens players
Montreal Canadiens scouts
Nashville Predators players
New Jersey Devils players
New Westminster Bruins players
Philadelphia Flyers draft picks
Philadelphia Flyers players
Pittsburgh Penguins players
Prince Albert Raiders players
Rockford IceHogs (UHL) players
St. Louis Blues players
Sportspeople from Flin Flon
Tampa Bay Lightning players
Wilkes-Barre/Scranton Penguins players
Canadian expatriate ice hockey players in Russia